The AA machine cannon carrier truck was a self-propelled anti-aircraft gun of the Imperial Japanese Army. It consisted of the Type 98 20 mm AA machine cannon mounted on the back of a Type 94 six-wheeled truck. The Type 94 truck was first produced in 1934 by Isuzu, and used for prototypes. It was known to be reliable and was produced in "large numbers".

The Type 98 20 mm AA autocannon was the most common light anti-aircraft gun of the Imperial Japanese Army. It had a range of 5,500 meters, altitude of 3,500 meters and could fire up to 300 rounds per minute. The gun could be fired from the rear platform of the truck or be unloaded and fired from the ground. These carrier trucks were deployed in the air defense units of the four Japanese tank divisions.

See also 
 Type 98 20 mm AA half-track vehicle
 Type 98 20 mm AAG tank

Notes

References
Imperial Japanese Army Page - Akira Takizawa

World War II self-propelled anti-aircraft weapons
20 mm artillery
World War II vehicles of Japan
World War II weapons of Japan
Military vehicles introduced in the 1930s